Tralles or Tralleis (Τράλλεις) was a town of ancient Phrygia, on the west of Apamea, and 15 miles east of Hierapolis not far from the banks of the Maeander.

William Smith accepts that the ruins near Kuslar are the site of Tralles, but modern scholars leave the town as unlocated.

References

Populated places in Phrygia
Former populated places in Turkey
Lost ancient cities and towns